The Book of Chad is the debut studio album by South African hip hop record producer and rapper Chad da Don. The album was released on 16 April 2016 on his record label DCM Entertainment. The album debuted and peaked at No. 1 on the Hip Hop / Rap chart the South African iTunes Store, and was made available for streaming on Apple Music and Tidal.

The album was preceded by the single "EFT" which was produced by and features award-winning record producer Brian Soko, and the controversial single "Chad is Better", a diss-track which takes shots at his former label-boss Cassper Nyovest.

Track listing

References 

2016 debut albums
Chad (rapper) albums
Albums produced by Tweezy